Zamil Al-Sulim is a Saudi Arabian football player. He was born on 29 October 1989 in Unaizah in Saudi Arabia and plays for Al-Najma in the position of striker. He played for Al-Najma as a striker .

In 2011, he moved from Al-Najma club to Ettifaq FC for a record 1.2 million SAR, approximately US$320,000.

International goals

Under–23

Scores and results list Saudi Arabia's goal tally first.

Honours

Club
Al-Najma
Saudi Second Division (1): 2009–10

External links
goalzz.com - English
www.slstat.com - English

References

1989 births
Living people
Saudi Arabian footballers
Association football forwards
Al-Najma SC players
Ettifaq FC players
Al-Wehda Club (Mecca) players
Al-Shoulla FC players
Saudi Arabian Sunni Muslims
People from Unaizah
Saudi First Division League players
Saudi Professional League players
Saudi Second Division players
Saudi Fourth Division players